The Ministry of Energy (Sinhala: බලශක්ති අමාත්‍යාංශය Balashakthi Amathyanshaya; Tamil: பெற்றோலிய வள அபிவிருத்தி அமைச்சு) is the cabinet ministry of the Government of Sri Lanka responsible for oversight of the country's energy supply via crude oil import, storage and refining (carried out at the nation's sole refinery at Sapugaskanda), as well as sale (through the Ceylon Petroleum Corporation) of processed petroleum products. It is thus responsible for the maintenance of (and upgrades to) petroleum and petroleum product storage and transport facilities as well as for developing the country's natural gas and crude oil reserves.

The current minister is Udaya Gammanpila. The ministry's secretary is KDR Olga.

References

External links
 Ministry of Petroleum Resources Development
 Government of Sri Lanka
http://www.prds-srilanka.com/
https://ceypetco.gov.lk/
https://www.cpstl.lk/cpstl/

Petroleum Resources Development
Petroleum Resources Development
Energy in Sri Lanka
Energy ministries